Rashida is a feminine Arabic given name.

Rashida may also refer to:
"Rashida" (song)
Rashida, Libya
Rashida, Punjab, Pakistan
DJ Rashida

See also
Rasheeda, American songwriter